In the Soviet Union, a military district (voyenny okrug) was a territorial association of military units, formations, military schools, and various local military administrative establishments known as military commissariats. This territorial division type was utilised in the USSR to provide a more efficient management of army units, their training and other operations activities related to combat readiness.

First military districts in the USSR begun with the formation of the first six military districts (Yaroslavsky, Moskovsky, Orlovsky, Belomorsky, Uralsky, and Privolzhsky) on 31 March 1918 during the Russian Civil War to prepare substantial army reserves for the front.

The next reform did not take place until the economic reforms (NEP) of 1923 which concluded in 1929. At this time the military districts in the Russian Soviet Republic still conformed to the gubernyas and oblasts of the Russian Empire, with the exception of the other republics each of which constituted a military district in their own right.

Abbreviation of military districts
Abbreviation of 17 military districts of the USSR at the beginning July 1940: 
BOVO – Belorussian Special Military District (from 11.7.40 ZapOVO – Western Special military district
KOVO – Kiev Special Military District 
ArkhVO – Arkhangelsk Military District 
ZabVO – Transbaikal Military District
ZakVO – Transcaucasian Military District 
KalVO – Kalinin Military District (abolished by 11.7.1940)
LVO – Leningrad Military District
MVO – Moscow Military District
OdVO – Odessa Military District 
OrVO – Orel Military District
PribVO – Baltic Military District (formed 11.07.40, from August 17, 1940 renamed into PribOVO - Baltic Special Military District)
PriVO – Volga Military District
SAVO – Central Asian Military District
SibVO – Siberian Military District
SKVO – North Caucasus Military District
UrVO – Ural Military District
KhVO – Kharkov Military District

Formations in the territory of Khabarovsk and Primorsky Krai were combined into the 1st and 2nd independent Red Banner Armies, which since January 14, 1941 were reformed into the Far Eastern Front.

World War II

The number of military districts varied depending on the circumstances and with the evolution of the Soviet Army. Before the eastern campaign of 1941–45, there were 16 military districts and one front although this number fluctuated and as many as 25 military districts existed at different time before the war.

North and North Western districts
Arkhangel Military District
Belomorsky Military District
Leningrad Military District
Baltic special military district
Kalinin Military District

West and Central USSR districts
Western special military district
Moscow Military District
Yaroslavl Military District
Orel Military District
Steppe Military District
Kiev special military district

South and South Western districts
Ukrainian Military District
Kharkov Military District created 1919 1st formation, (1935 - 1941), 2nd formation used for formation of the 18th Army, 3rd formation in September 1943, disbanded and amalgamated into the Kiev Military district in June 1946 as the 21st Army
Odessa Military District
Tauric Military District created from Separate Coastal Army and 22nd Army on 9 July 1945.  Incorporated into Odessa Military District 4 April 1956. 
Trans-Volga Military District (for Trans-Volga Region)
Transcaucasian Military District
North Caucasus Military District

Siberian and Central Asian districts
Volga Military District
Ural Military District
Western Siberian Military District
Siberian Military District
Central Asian Military District
Turkestan regional military commissariat

Far Eastern districts
Eastern Siberian Military District
Far Eastern Military District
Transbaikal Military District

Right after the war, the number was increased to 35 to aid in demobilisation of forces, but by October 1946, they had been reduced to 21.

Cold War era

At the end of the 1980s, immediately before the dissolution of the Soviet Union, there were sixteen military districts, within three to five main groupings:
Western Theatre
Western Strategic Direction
Group of Soviet Forces in Germany
Northern Group of Forces (Poland)
Central Group of Forces (Czechoslovakia)
Baltic Military District
Belorussian Military District
Carpathian Military District
South-Western Strategic Direction
Southern Group of Forces (Hungary)
Odessa Military District
Kiev Military District
Northwestern Theatre
Leningrad Military District
Far Eastern Strategic Direction/Theatre
Siberian Military District
Transbaikal Military District
Far Eastern Military District
Central Asian Military District
Southern Theatre
Transcaucasian Military District
North Caucasus Military District
Turkestan Military District
Central Reserve
Moscow Military District
Volga Military District
Ural Military District

References

Further reading
Red Banner Belorussian Military District / ed. Ovchinnikov, NA Shapalina. - 1 ed. - Mn.: Of Belarus, 1973. - 576 p. - 30 000 copies.
Red Banner Far East / ed. I. Tretiak. - M.: Military Publishing, 1985. - 348 p. - 50 000 copies.
Trans-Baikal Military District. A brief historical sketch of the military. - Irkutsk: East Siberian book publishing house, 1972. - 508 p. - 75 000 copies.
Order of Lenin Zabaikalsk. History of the Order of Lenin Trans-Baikal Military District. - M.: Military Publishing, 1980. - 374 p. - 75 000 copies.
Red Banner Transcaucasian / ed. A. Overchuk, Karen Demirchyan, O. Kulisheva. - 2 - TB.: Sabchota Sakartvelo, 1981. - 400 p. - 25 000 copies.
Kiev Red Banner. Studies in the History of the Red Banner of the Kiev military district. - 1 - M.: Military Publishing, 1974. - 432 p. - 40 000 copies.
History of the Order of Lenin Leningrad Military District. - 3 - M.: Military Publishing, 1988. - 446 p. - 35 000 copies.
Order of Lenin Moscow military district / ed. IP Repin. - 3 - M.: Moscow Worker, 1985. - 620 p. - 70 000 copies.
Odessa Red Banner. - Chisinau: Kartia Moldoveniaske, 1985. - 344 p. - 25 000 copies.
Red Banner Volga. The history of the Red Banner troops Volga Military District. - 2 - M.: Military Publishing, 1985. - 392 p. - 39 000 copies.
Red Banner Carpathian. The history of the Red Banner Carpathian Military District. - 2 - M.: Military Publishing, 1982. - 306 p. - 39 000 copies.
IA Gubin. The word of the Red Banner Baltic. - 1 - Riga: Avots, 1981. - 296 p. - 20 000.
You serve in the Central Asian Red Banner. - Almaty: Kazakhstan, 1979. - 252 p.
Soldiers of the North / ed. A. Migunova A. SIDORCHUK. - 1 - M.: Military Publishing, 1985. - 248 p. - 15 000 copies.
The flame and glory. Essays on the history of the Siberian Military District. - 1. - Novosibirsk: West Siberian book publishing house, 1969. - 430 p.
Red Banner Northern Caucasus / ed. Degtyarev. - 2 - M.: Military Publishing, 1990. - 380 p. - 10 000 copies. - .
Group of authors. Red Banner Turkestan / Under total. Ed. General of the Army Nikolai Popova. - 2nd ed., Rev. and add. - M.: Military Publishing, 1988. - 414 p. - 35 thousand, ind. - .
History of the Urals Military District / ed. AA Egorov, IV Tutarinov. - 1 - M.: Military Publishing, 1970. - 352 p. - 11 500 copies.

 

ru:Военный округ